Armando Monteiro (born 24 February 1952) is a Brazilian politician and lawyer. He has represented Pernambuco in the Federal Senate from 2011 to 2019. He was the Minister of Development, Industry and Foreign Trade from 2015 to 2016, during the second term of president Dilma Rousseff. Previously he was a Deputy for Pernambuco from 1999 to 2011. He is a member of the Brazilian Social Democracy Party.

Monteiro is the son of the late Armando Monteiro Filho, who served as Minister of Agriculture of Brazil from 1961 to 1962.

References

Living people
1952 births
Members of the Federal Senate (Brazil)
Government ministers of Brazil
Pernambuco politicians
20th-century Brazilian lawyers
Politicians from Recife
Brazilian Labour Party (current) politicians
Fundação Getulio Vargas alumni

Brazilian Social Democracy Party politicians
Brazilian Democratic Movement politicians